Oleksandr Stelmakh is a retired Ukrainian football player.

Career
Oleksandr Stelmakh was a football goalkeer born in the city of Chernihiv. His career started in 1993 in the main club of the city Desna Chernihiv in Ukrainian First League. In the season 1993–94 without playing and the club was relegated in Ukrainian Second League. In the season 1994–95 he played 18 matches and become the main goalkeeper of the club which got 11th place in Ukrainian Second League. He also played two matches in Ukrainian Cup in the same season, but even playing more regular, in January 1995 he has been transferred to Tekstylschyk Chernihiv in the same city, where he played six matches in the Chernihiv Oblast Football Championship getting 8th place.

References

External links 
 Oleksandr Stelmakh at footballfacts.ru

1976 births
Living people
Footballers from Chernihiv
FC Desna Chernihiv players
FC Cheksyl Chernihiv players
Ukrainian footballers
Ukrainian Second League players
Association football goalkeepers